This is a list of hate symbols, including acronyms, numbers, phrases, logos, flags, gestures and other miscellaneous symbols used for hateful purposes, according to the Anti-Defamation League. Some of these items have been appropriated by hate groups and may have other, non-hate-group-related meanings.

Acronyms

Numerical

Phrases

Hate group logos

Flags

Gestures

Miscellaneous symbols

See also
Armanen runes
Cross burning
Far-right subcultures
Fascist symbolism
List of fascist movements 
List of Ku Klux Klan organizations
List of neo-Nazi organizations
List of organizations designated by the Southern Poverty Law Center as hate groups
List of white nationalist organizations
Nazi symbolism
The modern Federal Republic of Germany's Strafgesetzbuch section 86a

References
Informational notes
a.This symbol, while sometimes used as a hate symbol, is also used as a religious symbol for many pagans, and should not be assumed to be a hate symbol in all contexts.

Citations

Nazi symbolism
Hate symbols
Anti-Defamation League